Augustin Eduard Chiriță (born 10 October 1975) is a Romanian former footballER who played as a midfielder for teams such as Minerul Motru, Argeș Pitești, Karpaty Lviv or Spartak Ivano-Frankivsk, among others. After retirement, Chiriță started his football manager career and was the assistant manager of Victoria Brănești, Olt Slatina and Ordabasy-2, among others. Since 2014, he was the fitness coach of Bunyodkor and Kyran.

External links
 
 Profile at FFU website 

1975 births
Living people
Sportspeople from Slatina, Romania
Romanian footballers
Association football midfielders
Liga I players
Liga II players
Liga III players
Ukrainian Premier League players
Ukrainian First League players
Liga Leumit players
CS Minerul Motru players
FC U Craiova 1948 players
FC Argeș Pitești players
FC Karpaty Lviv players
FC Spartak Ivano-Frankivsk players
Hapoel Be'er Sheva F.C. players
CS Inter Gaz București players
FC Olt Slatina players
CS Brănești players
Romanian expatriate footballers
Expatriate footballers in Ukraine
Romanian expatriate sportspeople in Ukraine
Expatriate footballers in Israel
Romanian expatriate sportspeople in Israel
Expatriate footballers in Germany
Romanian expatriate sportspeople in Germany
Romanian expatriate sportspeople in Kazakhstan